Endless Fantasy is the second studio album by American chiptune-based pop and rock band Anamanaguchi released on May 14, 2013 in the US through the band's own dream.hax record label and on September 30, 2013 in the UK by Alcopop! Records.

On May 3, 2013, Anamanaguchi provided a Kickstarter project for the album. In just 11 hours, their funding goal of $50,000 was reached. At the end of its run, the project was backed by 7,253 people who contributed to raising a grand total of $277,399, making it the second most successful music project to be funded on Kickstarter at the time, behind that of singer Amanda Palmer.

On May 23, 2013, the album debuted at No. 1 in Billboards Heatseekers Albums chart as well as No. 2 in Dance/Electronic Albums.

Track listing

All songs were written and composed by Peter Berkman and Ary Warnaar except where noted.

Charts

References

2013 albums
Alcopop! Records albums
Crowdfunded albums
Media containing Gymnopedies
Electronic albums by American artists
Kickstarter-funded albums
Chiptune albums
Synth-pop albums by American artists